Packs are a Canadian indie rock band from Toronto.

History
The band originated as the solo project of musician Madeline Link. The project later turned into a band, consisting of Link, guitarist Dexter Nash, bassist Noah O'Neil, and drummer Shane Hooper. After releasing singles throughout 2019, the band got the attention of Brooklyn based label Fire Talk Records, who signed them in 2020. In March 2021, the band announced their debut album, Take The Cake, to be released jointly through Fire Talk Records and Royal Mountain Records. The album was released on May 14, 2021. The album received mixed reviews.

Discography
Studio albums
Take The Cake (2021, Fire Talk Records, Royal Mountain Records)
Crispy Crunchy Nothing (2023, Fire Talk Records)

References

Musical groups from Toronto
Royal Mountain Records artists
Canadian indie rock groups
Year of establishment missing